These 1281 species belong to Culicoides, a genus of biting midges in the family Ceratopogonidae.

Culicoides species

A

 Culicoides abchazicus Dzhafarov, 1964 c g
 Culicoides acanthostomus Wirth & Hubert, 1989 c g
 Culicoides accraensis Carter, Ingram & Macfie, 1920 c g
 Culicoides achkamalicus Dzhafarov, 1964 c g
 Culicoides achrayi Kettle & Lawson, 1955 c g
 Culicoides acotylus Lutz, 1913 c g
 Culicoides actoni Smith, 1929 c g
 Culicoides adamskii Wirth, 1990 c g
 Culicoides adersi Ingram & Macfie, 1923 c g
 Culicoides africanus Clastrier, 1959 c g
 Culicoides agas Wirth & Hubert, 1989 c g
 Culicoides aitkeni Wirth & Blanton, 1968 c g
 Culicoides alachua Jamnback and Wirth, 1963 i c g
 Culicoides alahialinus Barbosa, 1952 c g
 Culicoides alaskensis Wirth, 1951 i c g
 Culicoides alatavicus Gutsevich & Smatov & Isimbekov, 1971 c g
 Culicoides alazanicus Dzhafarov, 1961 c g
 Culicoides albibasis Wirth & Hubert, 1959 c g
 Culicoides albicans (Winnertz, 1852) c g
 Culicoides albifascia Tokunaga, 1937 c g
 Culicoides albipennis Kieffer, 1925 c g
 Culicoides albofascia Tokunaga, 1937 g
 Culicoides albomacula Root & Hoffman, 1937 c g
 Culicoides albomotatus Kieffer, 1918 c g
 Culicoides albopunctatus Clastrier, 1960 c g
 Culicoides albosparsus Kieffer, 1918 c g
 Culicoides albovenosus Khamala, 1991 c g
 Culicoides alexanderi Wirth and Hubert, 1962 i c g
 Culicoides alexandrae Dzhafarov, 1962 c g
 Culicoides algecirensis (Strobl, 1900) c g
 Culicoides algeriensis Clastrier, 1957 c g
 Culicoides alishanensis Chen, 1988 g
 Culicoides alishenensis Chen, 1988 c g
 Culicoides allantothecus Wirth & Hubert, 1989 c g
 Culicoides almeidae Cambournac, 1970 c g
 Culicoides almirantei Wirth & Blanton, 1959 c g
 Culicoides alpicola (Strobl, 1910) c g
 Culicoides altaicus Remm, 1972 c g
 Culicoides alticola Kieffer, 1913 c g
 Culicoides alvarezi Ortiz, 1957 c g
 Culicoides amamiensis Tokunaga, 1937 c g
 Culicoides amaniensis Khamala, 1991 c g
 Culicoides amazonicus Santarem, Felippe-Bauer & Trindade g
 Culicoides amazonius  i g
 Culicoides ameliae Browne, 1980 c g
 Culicoides amossovae Remm, 1971 c g
 Culicoides anadyriensis Mirzayeva, 1984 c g
 Culicoides analis Santos Abreu, 1918 c g
 Culicoides andicola Wirth & Lee, 1967 c g
 Culicoides andinus Wirth & Lee, 1967 c g
 Culicoides andrewsi Causey, 1938 c g
 Culicoides angkaensis Kitaoka, Takaoka & Choochote, 2005 c g
 Culicoides angolensis Caeiro, 1961 c g
 Culicoides annandalei Gangopadhyay & Dasgupta, 2000 c g
 Culicoides annettae Spinelli & Borkent, 2004 c g
 Culicoides annuliductus Vitale, Wirth & Aitken, 1981 c g
 Culicoides anophelis Edwards, 1922 c g
 Culicoides antefurcatus Wirth & Blanton, 1959 c g
 Culicoides antennalis Lee & Reye, 1953 c g
 Culicoides antunesi Forattini, 1954 c g
 Culicoides aomoriensis Kitaoka, 1991 c g
 Culicoides aquilinus Smatov & Kravets, 1976 c g
 Culicoides arabiensis Boorman, 1989 c g
 Culicoides aragaoi Tavares & Dias, 1980 c g
 Culicoides arakawae (Arakawa, 1910) c g
 Culicoides arakawai (Arakawa, 1910) c g
 Culicoides arboreus Gutsevich, 1952 c g
 Culicoides arboricola Root and Hoffman, 1937 i c g
 Culicoides archboldi Wirth & Blanton, 1970 c g
 Culicoides ardentissimus Tokunaga, 1940 c g
 Culicoides ardleyi Tokunaga, 1962 c g
 Culicoides arenarius Edwards, 1922 c g
 Culicoides arenicola Howarth, 1985 c g
 Culicoides aricola Kieffer, 1922 c g
 Culicoides arizonensis Wirth and Hubert, 1960 i c g
 Culicoides arnaudi Wirth & Hubert, 1961 c g
 Culicoides arschanicus Mirzayeva, 1984 c g
 Culicoides arubae Fox and Hoffman, 1944 i c g
 Culicoides asiatica Bellis g
 Culicoides asiaticus Gutsevich & Smatov, 1966 c g
 Culicoides atchleyi Wirth and Blanton, 1969 i c g
 Culicoides atelis Wirth, 1982 c g
 Culicoides aterinervis Tokunaga, 1937 c g
 Culicoides atripennis Shevchenko, 1972 c g
 Culicoides aureus Ortiz, 1951 c g
 Culicoides austeni Carter, Ingram & Macfie, 1920 c g
 Culicoides austini (Carter, Imgram, Macfie) i g
 Culicoides australiensis Kieffer, 1917 c g
 Culicoides austropalpalis Lee & Reye, 1955 c g
 Culicoides austroparaensis Spinelli, 2005 c g
 Culicoides autumnalis Sen & Gupta, 1959 c g
 Culicoides avilaensis Ortiz & Mirsa, 1951 c g
 Culicoides azerbajdzhanicus Dzhafarov, 1962 c g
 Culicoides azureus Wirth & Blanton, 1959 c g

B

 Culicoides bachmanni Spinelli, 2005 c g
 Culicoides bahrainensis Boorman, 1989 c g
 Culicoides baisasi Wirth & Hubert, 1959 c g
 Culicoides bajensis Wirth & Assis de Moraes, 1979 c g
 Culicoides bakeri Vargas, 1954 c g
 Culicoides balsapambensis Ortiz & Leon, 1954 c g
 Culicoides bambusicola Lutz, 1913 c g
 Culicoides bancrofti Lee & Reye, 1953 c g
 Culicoides baniwa Felippe-Bauer, 2009 g
 Culicoides barbosai (Wirth and Blanton) i c g
 Culicoides barnetti Wirth & Hubert, 1959 c g
 Culicoides barreti Wirth & Hubert, 1959 g
 Culicoides barrosmachadoi Callot, Kremer & Molet, 1967 c g
 Culicoides barthi Tavares & Alves de Souza, 1978 c g
 Culicoides bassetorum Callot, Kremer & Molet, 1973 c g
 Culicoides baueri Hoffman, 1925 i c g
 Culicoides bayano Vitale, Wirth & Aitken, 1981 c g
 Culicoides beaveri Wirth & Barreto, 1978 c g
 Culicoides beckae Wirth and Blanton, 1967 i c g
 Culicoides bedfordi Ingram & Macfie, 1923 c g
 Culicoides begueti Clastrier, 1957 c g
 Culicoides belgicus Kieffer, 1919 c g
 Culicoides belkini (Wirth and Arnaud) i c g
 Culicoides benarrochi Ortiz & Mirsa, 1952 c g
 Culicoides bergi Cochrane, 1973 i c g
 Culicoides bermudensis Williams, 1956 i c g
 Culicoides bernardae Itoua & Cornet, 1987 c g
 Culicoides beybienkoi Dzhafarov, 1962 c g
 Culicoides biarcuatus Vimmer, 1932 c g
 Culicoides bickleyi Wirth and Hubert, 1962 i c g
 Culicoides biestroi Spinelli, 1991 c g
 Culicoides bifasciatus Tokunaga, 1951 c g
 Culicoides bigeminus Wirth & Hubert, 1989 c g
 Culicoides biguttatus (Coquillett, 1901) i c g
 Culicoides bilobatus Kieffer, 1912 c g
 Culicoides bimaculatus Floch & Abonnence, 1942 c g
 Culicoides birabeni Cavalieri, 1966 c g
 Culicoides biscapus Kieffer, 1925 c g
 Culicoides bisignatus Kieffer, 1921 c g
 Culicoides bisolis Kremer & Brunhes, 1973 c g
 Culicoides blantoni Vargas and Wirth, 1955 i c g
 Culicoides bodemensis Clastrier & Delecolle, 1996 c g
 Culicoides bodemheimeri Vimmer, 1932 c g
 Culicoides bolitinos Meiswinkel, 1989 c g
 Culicoides boliviensis Spinelli, 1991 c g
 Culicoides boophagus Macfie, 1937 c g
 Culicoides boormani Giles & Wirth, 1985 c g
 Culicoides borinqueni Fox & Hoffman, 1944 c g
 Culicoides bottimeri Wirth, 1955 i c g
 Culicoides bougainvillae Tokunaga, 1962 c g
 Culicoides boydi Wirth & Mullens, 1992 c g
 Culicoides brasilianus Forattini, 1956 c g
 Culicoides bredini Wirth & Blanton, 1970 c g
 Culicoides brevifrontis Smatov & Isimbekov, 1971 c g
 Culicoides brevipalpis Delfinado, 1961 c g
 Culicoides brevitarsis Kieffer, 1917 c g
 Culicoides bricenoi Oritz, 1951 c g
 Culicoides brinchangensis Wirth & Hubert, 1989 c g
 Culicoides bromophilus Kieffer, 1922 c g
 Culicoides brookmani Wirth, 1952 i c g
 Culicoides brosseti Vattier & Adam, 1966 c g
 Culicoides brownei Spinelli, 1993 c g
 Culicoides brucei Austen, 1909 c g
 Culicoides brunnicans Edwards, 1939 c g
 Culicoides bubalus Delfinado, 1961 c g
 Culicoides buettikeri Boorman, 1989 c g
 Culicoides buhetoensis Takahasi, 1941 c g
 Culicoides bulbostylus Khalaf, 1961 c g
 Culicoides bundyensis Lee & Reye, 1955 c g
 Culicoides bunrooensis Lee & Reye, 1955 c g
 Culicoides burylovi Glukhova & Khabirov, 1977 c g
 Culicoides butleri Wirth and Hubert, 1960 i c g
 Culicoides bwambanus Meillon, 1952 c g
 Culicoides bychowskyi Dzhafarov, 1964 c g
 Culicoides byersi Atchley, 1967 i c g

C

 Culicoides cacticola Wirth and Hubert, 1960 i c g
 Culicoides calcaratus Wirth & Hubert, 1989 c g
 Culicoides caldasi Browne, 1980 c g
 Culicoides calexicanus Wirth and Rowley, 1971 i c g
 Culicoides californiensis Wirth and Blanton, 1967 i c g
 Culicoides caliginosus Goetghebuer, 1952 c g
 Culicoides calloti Kremer, Delecolle & Bailly-Choumara, 1979 c g
 Culicoides cambodiensis Chu, 1986 c g
 Culicoides cameronensis Kitaoka, 1983 c g
 Culicoides cameroni Campbell & Pelham-Clinton, 1960 c g
 Culicoides camicasi Cornet & Chateau, 1971 c g
 Culicoides camposi Ortiz & Leon, 1954 c g
 Culicoides canadensis Wirth and Blanton, 1969 i
 Culicoides cancer Hogue & Wirth, 1968 c g
 Culicoides cancrisocius Macfie, 1946 c g
 Culicoides capillosus Borkent, 1997 c g
 Culicoides capricorniae Dyce & Wirth, 1997 c g
 Culicoides caprilesi Fox, 1952 c g
 Culicoides caridei (Brethes, 1912) c g
 Culicoides carpenteri Wirth & Blanton, 1953 c g
 Culicoides carpophilus Wirth & Hubert, 1989 c g
 Culicoides carsiomelas Wirth & Blanton, 1955 c g
 Culicoides castillae Fox, 1946 c g
 Culicoides cataneii Clastrier, 1957 c g
 Culicoides catharinae Kremer, 1991 c g
 Culicoides caucaensis Wirth & Lee, 1967 c g
 Culicoides caucoliberensis Callot, Kremer & Rioux, 1967 c g
 Culicoides causeyi Gangopadhyay & Dasgupta, 2000 c g
 Culicoides cavaticus Wirth and Jones, 1956 i c g
 Culicoides certus Gupta, 1962 c g
 Culicoides ceylanicus Kieffer, 1912 c g
 Culicoides chacoensis Spinelli, 1991 c g
 Culicoides chagyabensis Lee, 1982 c g
 Culicoides changbaiensis Qu & Ye, 1995 c g
 Culicoides charadraeus Arnaud, 1956 c g
 Culicoides charrua Spinelli, 1991 c g
 Culicoides chateaui Cornet, 1970 c g
 Culicoides chaverrii Spinelli & Borkent, 2004 c g
 Culicoides chazeaui Clastrier & Delecolle, 1996 c g
 Culicoides cheahi Kitaoka, 1983 c g
 Culicoides chengduensis Zhou & Lee, 1984 c g
 Culicoides cheni Kitaoka & Tanaka, 1985 c g
 Culicoides chewaclae Glick and Mullen, 1983 i c g
 Culicoides chiopterus (Meigen, 1830) i c g
 Culicoides chitinosus Gutsevich & Smatov, 1966 c g
 Culicoides choochotei Kitaoka & Takaoka, 2005 c g
 Culicoides chrysonotus Wirth & Blanton, 1956 c g
 Culicoides ciliodentatus Khamala, 1991 c g
 Culicoides cilipes Kieffer, 1921 c g
 Culicoides cinereus (Kieffer, 1925) c g
 Culicoides circumbasalis Tokunaga, 1959 c g
 Culicoides circumscriptus (Kieffer) i c g
 Culicoides citroneus Carter, Ingram & Macfie, 1920 c g
 Culicoides claggi Tokunaga, 1959 c g
 Culicoides clarkei Carter, Ingram & Macfie, 1920 c g
 Culicoides clastrier Callot, Kremer & Deduit, 1962 c g
 Culicoides clastrieri Callot, Kremer & Deduit, 1962 g
 Culicoides clavipalpis Mukerji, 1931 c g
 Culicoides cleaves Liu, 1995 c g
 Culicoides clintoni Boorman, 1984 c g
 Culicoides coarctatus Clastrier & Wirth, 1961 c g
 Culicoides cochisensis Wirth and Blanton, 1967 i c g
 Culicoides cockerellii (Coquillett, 1901) i c g
 Culicoides combinothecus Yu & Li, 1986 c g
 Culicoides commatis Wirth & Blanton, 1959 c g
 Culicoides comosioculatus Tokunaga, 1956 c g
 Culicoides confusus Carter, Ingram & Macfie, 1920 c g
 Culicoides congolensis Clastrier, 1960 c g
 Culicoides copiosus Root and Hoffman, 1937 i c g
 Culicoides coracinus Borkent, 1997 c g
 Culicoides cordiformis Kieffer, 1927 c g
 Culicoides cordiger Macfie, 1934 c g
 Culicoides corneti Kremer, 1972 c g
 Culicoides corniculus Liu & Qu, 1981 c g
 Culicoides cornutus Meillon, 1937 c g
 Culicoides coronalis Lee & Reye, 1955 c g
 Culicoides corsicus Kremer, Leberre & Beaucournu-Saguez, 1971 g
 Culicoides corsis Kremer, Leberre & Beaucournu-Saguez, 1971 c g
 Culicoides corsoni Ingram & Macfie, 1921 c g
 Culicoides corti Causey, 1938 c g
 Culicoides costalis Tokunaga, 1963 c g
 Culicoides coutinhoi Barretto, 1944 c g
 Culicoides covagarciai Ortiz, 1950 c g
 Culicoides crassipilosus Tokunaga, 1937 c g
 Culicoides crassus Tokunaga, 1962 c g
 Culicoides crepuscularis Malloch, 1915 i c g b
 Culicoides crescentris Wirth & Blanton, 1959 c g
 Culicoides crucifer Clastrier, 1968 c g
 Culicoides cuiabai Wirth, 1982 c g
 Culicoides culiciphagus Wirth & Hubert, 1959 c g
 Culicoides cummingi Spinelli & Borkent, 2004 c g
 Culicoides cunctans (Winnertz, 1852) c g
 Culicoides cuniculus Lee & Reye, 1953 c g
 Culicoides cylindratus Kitaoka, 1980 c g

D

 Culicoides daedaloides Wirth & Blanton, 1959 c g
 Culicoides daedalus Macfie, 1948 i c g
 Culicoides dalessandroi Wirth & Barreto, 1978 c g
 Culicoides damnosus Delfinado, 1961 c g
 Culicoides dampfi Root & Hoffman, 1937 c g
 Culicoides darlingtonae Wirth & Blanton, 1971 c g
 Culicoides dasyophus Macfie, 1940 c g
 Culicoides dasyops Clastrier, 1958 c g
 Culicoides davidi Spinelli, 1993 c g
 Culicoides daviesi Wirth & Blanton, 1968 c g
 Culicoides davisi Wirth and Rowley, 1971 i c g
 Culicoides deanei Felippe-Bauer & Wirth, 1987 c g
 Culicoides debilipalpis Lutz, 1913 i c g
 Culicoides decor (Williston, 1896) c g
 Culicoides definitus Sen & Gupta, 1959 c g
 Culicoides defoliarti Atchley and Wirth, 1979 i c g
 Culicoides dekeyseri Clastrier, 1958 c g
 Culicoides delfinadoae Wirth & Hubert, 1989 c g
 Culicoides delta Edwards, 1939 c g
 Culicoides dendriticus Boorman, 1976 c g
 Culicoides dendrophilus Amossova, 1957 c g
 Culicoides denisae Clastrier, 1971 c g
 Culicoides denisoni Boorman, 1988 c g
 Culicoides denningi Foote and Pratt, 1954 i c g
 Culicoides dentatus Kieffer, 1921 c g
 Culicoides denticulatus Wirth and Hubert, 1962 i c g
 Culicoides dentiformis McDonald & Wu, 1972 g
 Culicoides derisor Callot & Kremer, 1965 c g
 Culicoides desertorum Gutsevich, 1959 c g
 Culicoides desytoculus Liu & Zhao, 1998 c g
 Culicoides dewulfi Goetghebuer, 1936 c g
 Culicoides diabolicus Hoffman, 1925 c g
 Culicoides diamouanganai Itoua & Cornet, 1987 c g
 Culicoides dicrourus Wirth & Blanton, 1955 c g
 Culicoides diffusus Spinelli, 1993 c g
 Culicoides digitalis Remm, 1973 c g
 Culicoides dikhros Tokunaga, 1962 c g
 Culicoides diplus Santarem & Felippe-Bauer g
 Culicoides discrepans Ortiz & Mirsa, 1951 c g
 Culicoides dispar Clastrier, 1959 c g
 Culicoides dispersus Gutsevich & Smatov, 1966 c g
 Culicoides distinctipennis Austen, 1912 c g
 Culicoides distinctus Sen & Gupta, 1959 c g
 Culicoides diversus Felippe-Bauer, 2003 c g
 Culicoides divisus Wirth & Hubert, 1989 c g
 Culicoides doeringae Atchley, 1967 i c g
 Culicoides dominicanus Wirth & Blanton, 1970 c g
 Culicoides donajil Vargas, 1954 c g
 Culicoides downesi Wirth and Hubert, 1962 i c g
 Culicoides duartei Tavares & Dias, 1980 c g
 Culicoides dubiosum Dyce & Wirth, 1997 c g
 Culicoides dubitatus Kremer, Rebholtz-Hirtzel & Delecolle, 1976 c g
 Culicoides dubius Arnaud, 1956 c g
 Culicoides duddingstoni Kettle & Lawson, 1955 c g
 Culicoides dukinensis Mirzayeva, 1985 c g
 Culicoides dumdumi Sen & Gupta, 1959 c g
 Culicoides dungunensis Wirth & Hubert, 1989 c g
 Culicoides dunhuaensis Chu, 1983 c g
 Culicoides dunni Wirth & Blanton, 1959 c g
 Culicoides duodenarius Kieffer, 1921 c g
 Culicoides dureti Ronderos & Spinelli, 1995 c g
 Culicoides dutoiti Meillon, 1943 c g
 Culicoides dycei Lee & Reye, 1953 c g
 Culicoides dzhafarovi Remm, 1967 c g

E

 Culicoides eadsi Wirth and Blanton, 1971 i c g
 Culicoides edeni Wirth and Blanton, 1974 i c g
 Culicoides efferus Fox, 1952 c g
 Culicoides effusus Delfinado, 1961 c g
 Culicoides elbeli Wirth & Hubert, 1959 c g
 Culicoides eldridgei Wirth & Barreto, 1978 c g
 Culicoides elemae Pappas & Pappas, 1989 c g
 Culicoides elizabethae Dyce & Wirth, 1997 c g
 Culicoides elongatus Chu & Liu, 1978 c g
 Culicoides elutus Macfie, 1948 c g
 Culicoides enderleini Cornet & Brunhes, 1994 c g
 Culicoides engubandei Meillon, 1937 c g
 Culicoides equatoriensis Barbosa, 1952 c g
 Culicoides erairai Kono & Takahasi, 1940 c g
 Culicoides erikae Atchley and Wirth, 1979 i c g
 Culicoides eriodendroni Carter, Ingram & Macfie, 1920 c g
 Culicoides esakii Tokunaga, 1940 c g
 Culicoides espinolai Felippe-Bauer & Lourenco-de-Oliveira, 1987 c g
 Culicoides estevezae Ronderos & Spinelli, 1994 c g
 Culicoides eublepharus Macfie, 1948 c g
 Culicoides eupurus Dyce & Wirth, 1997 c g
 Culicoides evansi Wirth & Blanton, 1959 c g
 Culicoides excavatus Khamala, 1991 c g
 Culicoides expalleus Remm, 1973 c g
 Culicoides exspectator Clastrier, 1959 c g

F

 Culicoides fadzili Kitaoka, 1983 c g
 Culicoides faghihi Naval, 1971 c g
 Culicoides fagineus Edwards, 1939 c g
 Culicoides farri Wirth & Blanton, 1970 c g
 Culicoides fascipennis (Staeger, 1839) c g
 Culicoides felippebauerae Spinelli, 2007 c g
 Culicoides fernandezi Ortiz, 1954 c g
 Culicoides fernandoi Tavares & Alves de Souza, 1979 c g
 Culicoides ferreyrai Ronderos & Spinelli, 1995 c g
 Culicoides festivipenis Kieffer, 1914 c g
 Culicoides fieldi Wirth & Blanton, 1956 c g
 Culicoides filamentis Liu, Ge & Liu, 1996 c g
 Culicoides filarifer Hoffman, 1939 c g
 Culicoides filariferus Hoffmann, 1939 g
 Culicoides filicinus Gornostayeva & Gachegova, 1972 c g
 Culicoides filiductus Vitale, Wirth & Aitken, 1981 c g
 Culicoides firuzae Dzhafarov, 1958 c g
 Culicoides flabitibialis Kitaoka & Tanaka, 1985 g
 Culicoides flavescens Macfie, 1937 c g
 Culicoides flavidorsalis Tokunaga, 1959 c g
 Culicoides flavimaculinotalis Tokunaga, 1940 c g
 Culicoides flavipes Vimmer, 1932 c g
 Culicoides flavipulicaris Dzhafarov, 1964 c g
 Culicoides flavipunctatus Kitaoka, 1975 g
 Culicoides flavirostris Vimmer, 1932 c g
 Culicoides flaviscriptus Tokunaga, 1959 c g
 Culicoides flaviscutatus Wirth & Hubert, 1959 c g
 Culicoides flaviscutellaris Wirth & Hubert, 1989 c g
 Culicoides flavisomum Mirzayeva, 1984 c g
 Culicoides flavitibialis Kitaoka & Tanaka, 1985 c g
 Culicoides flavivenula Lima, 1937 c g
 Culicoides flavus Gornostayeva, 1980 c g
 Culicoides flinti Wirth, 1982 c g
 Culicoides flochabonnenci Ortiz & Mirsa, 1952 c g
 Culicoides florenciae Messersmith, 1972 c g
 Culicoides floridensis Beck, 1951 i c g
 Culicoides flukei Jones, 1956 i c g
 Culicoides fluminensis Santarem & Felippe-Bauer g
 Culicoides flumineus Macfie, 1937 c g
 Culicoides fluvialis Macfie, 1940 c g
 Culicoides fluviatilis (Lutz, 1914) c g
 Culicoides foleyi Kieffer, 1922 c g
 Culicoides footei Wirth and Jones, 1956 i c g
 Culicoides forattinii Ortiz, 1961 c g
 Culicoides fordae Wirth & Hubert, 1989 c g
 Culicoides fossicola Kieffer, 1922 c g
 Culicoides foxi Ortiz, 1950 c g
 Culicoides fragmentum Tokunaga, 1962 c g
 Culicoides franclemonti Cochrane, 1974 i c g
 Culicoides franklini Spinelli, 1993 c g
 Culicoides freeborni Wirth and Blanton, 1969 i c g
 Culicoides frohnei Wirth and Blanton, 1969 i c g
 Culicoides fukienensis Chen & Tsai, 1962 c g
 Culicoides fukudai Wada, 1990 c g
 Culicoides fulbrighti Lee & Reye, 1963 c g
 Culicoides fulvithorax (Austen, 1912) c g
 Culicoides fulvus Sen & Gupta, 1959 c g
 Culicoides furcillatus Callot, Kremer & Paradis, 1962 c g
 Culicoides furens (Poey) i c g
 Culicoides furensoides Williams, 1955 c g
 Culicoides fuscicaudae Macfie, 1947 c g
 Culicoides fuscus Goetghebuer, 1952 c g
 Culicoides fusipalpis Wirth & Blanton, 1973 g

G

 Culicoides gabaldoni Ortiz, 1954 c g
 Culicoides galindoi Wirth & Blanton, 1953 c g
 Culicoides galliardi Callot, Kremer & Molet, 1973 c g
 Culicoides gambiae Clastrier & Wirth, 1961 c g
 Culicoides garciai Wirth & Hubert, 1989 c g
 Culicoides gejgelensis Dzhafarov, 1964 c g
 Culicoides gemellus Macfie, 1934 c g
 Culicoides geminus Macfie, 1937 c g
 Culicoides gentilis Macfie, 1934 c g
 Culicoides gentiloides Kitaoka & Tanaka, 1985 c g
 Culicoides geocheloneoides Dyce & Meiswinkel, 1995 c g
 Culicoides germanus Macfie, 1940 c g
 Culicoides gewertzi Causey, 1938 c g
 Culicoides giganteus Khamala, 1991 c g
 Culicoides gigas Root & Hoffman, 1937 c g
 Culicoides ginesi Ortiz, 1951 c g
 Culicoides glabellus Wirth & Blanton, 1956 c g
 Culicoides glabrior Macfie, 1940 c g
 Culicoides gladysae Kettle, Elson & Dyce, 1976 c g
 Culicoides gluchovae Mirzayeva, 1974 c g
 Culicoides glushchenkoae Glukhova, 1989 c g
 Culicoides gorgasi Wirth & Blanton, 1953 c g
 Culicoides gornostaevae Mirzayeva, 1984 c g
 Culicoides gouldi Wirth & Hubert, 1989 c g
 Culicoides gracilipes Vaillant, 1954 c g
 Culicoides grahamii Austen, 1909 c g
 Culicoides grandensis Grogan & Philips, 2008 c g
 Culicoides gregsoni Wirth and Blanton, 1969 i c g
 Culicoides grenieri Vattier & Adam, 1966 c g
 Culicoides griffithi Wirth & Hubert, 1989 c g
 Culicoides griseidorsum Kieffer, 1918 c g
 Culicoides griseolus (Zetterstedt, 1855) c g
 Culicoides grisescens Edwards, 1939 c g
 Culicoides guadeloupensis Floch & Abonnenc, 1950 c g
 Culicoides guangxiensis Liu & Hao, 2003 c g
 Culicoides guarani Ronderos & Spinelli, 1994 c g
 Culicoides guerrai Wirth & Blanton, 1971 c g
 Culicoides guineensis Kieffer, 1918 c g
 Culicoides gulbenkiani Caeiro, 1959 c g
 Culicoides gutsevichi Sen & Gupta, 1958 c g
 Culicoides guttatus (Coquillett, 1904) c g
 Culicoides guttifer (de Meijere, 1907) c g
 Culicoides guttipennis (Coquillett, 1901) i c g
 Culicoides guyanensis Floch & Abonnenc, 1942 i c g
 Culicoides gymnopterus Edwards, 1926 c g

H

 Culicoides haematopotus Malloch, 1915 i c g
 Culicoides hainanensis Lee, 1975 g
 Culicoides haitiensis Delecolle, Raccurt & Rebholtz, 1981 c g
 Culicoides halonostictus Wirth & Hubert, 1989 c g
 Culicoides halophilus (Kieffer) i
 Culicoides hamiensis Chu, Qian & Ma, 1982 c g
 Culicoides hanae Braverman, Delecolle & Kremer, 1983 c g
 Culicoides haranti Rioux, Descous & Peach, 1959 c g
 Culicoides hasegawai Kanasugi & Kitaoka, 2001 c g
 Culicoides hawsi Wirth and Rowley, 1971 i c g
 Culicoides hayakawai Kitaoka, 1984 c g
 Culicoides hayesi Matta, 1967 c g
 Culicoides hegneri Causey, 1938 c g
 Culicoides heliconiae Fox & Hoffman, 1944 c g
 Culicoides heliophilus Edwards, 1921 c g
 Culicoides helveticus Callot, Kremer & Deduit, 1962 c g
 Culicoides hengduanshanensis Lee, 1984 c g
 Culicoides henryi Lee & Reye, 1963 c g
 Culicoides herero (Enderlein, 1908) c g
 Culicoides hermani Spinelli & Borkent, 2004 c g
 Culicoides heteroclitus Kremer & Callot & Kremer, 1965 c g
 Culicoides hewitti Causey, 1938 c g
 Culicoides hieroglyphicus Malloch, 1915 i c g
 Culicoides hildae Cornet & Nevill, 1979 c g
 Culicoides hildebrandoi Latreille, 1809 g
 Culicoides himalayae Kieffer, 1911 c g
 Culicoides hinmani Khalaf, 1952 i c g
 Culicoides hinnoi Howarth, 1985 c g
 Culicoides hirstus Khamala, 1991 c g
 Culicoides hirsutus (Khamala & Kettle, 1971) c g
 Culicoides hirtipennis Delfinado, 1961 c g
 Culicoides hirtulus (Coquillett, 1900) i c g
 Culicoides histrio Johannsen, 1946 c g
 Culicoides hitchcocki Spinelli, 1991 c g
 Culicoides hoffmani Fox, 1946 c g
 Culicoides hoffmanioides Wirth & Hubert, 1989 c g
 Culicoides hoguei Wirth and Moraes, 1979 i c g
 Culicoides hokkaidoensis Kitaoka, 1984 c g
 Culicoides holcus Lee, 1980 c g
 Culicoides hollandiensis Tokunaga, 1959 c g
 Culicoides hollensis (Melander and Brues, 1903) i c g
 Culicoides homochorus Remm & Zhogolev, 1968 c g
 Culicoides homochrous Remm, 1968 g
 Culicoides homotomus Kieffer, 1921 c g
 Culicoides hondurensis Spinelli & Borkent, 2004 c g
 Culicoides hornsbyensis Lee & Reye, 1963 c g
 Culicoides hortensis Khamala, 1991 c g
 Culicoides horticola Lutz, 1913 c g
 Culicoides huambensis (Caeiro, 1961) c g
 Culicoides huayingensis Zhou & Lee, 1984 c g
 Culicoides huberti Howarth, 1985 c g
 Culicoides huffi Causey, 1938 c g
 Culicoides hui Wirth & Hubert, 1961 c g
 Culicoides hulinensis Liu & Yu, 1996 c g
 Culicoides humeralis Okada, 1941 c g
 Culicoides husseyi Wirth and Blanton, 1971 i c g
 Culicoides hyalinus Tokunaga, 1962 c g
 Culicoides hylas Macfie, 1940 c g
 Culicoides hypsipyles (Meillon, 1936) c g

I-J

 Culicoides ibericus Dzhafarov, 1964 c g
 Culicoides ibriensis Boorman, 1989 c g
 Culicoides ichesi Ronderos & Spinelli, 1995 c g
 Culicoides ignacioi Forattini, 1957 c g
 Culicoides iliensis Gutsevich & Smatov, 1966 c g
 Culicoides imicola (Kieffer, 1913) c g
 Culicoides imitador Ortiz, 1953 c g
 Culicoides immaculatus Lee & Reye, 1953 c g
 Culicoides imperceptus Gupta, 1962 c g
 Culicoides impunctatus Goetghebuer, 1920 c g
 Culicoides impusilloides Spinelli, 1991 c g
 Culicoides indecorus Kieffer, 1912 c g
 Culicoides indianus Macfie, 1932 c g
 Culicoides inexploratus Sen & Gupta, 1959 c g
 Culicoides inflatipalpalis Tokunaga, 1963 c g
 Culicoides infulatus Delfinado, 1961 c g
 Culicoides ingignipennis Macfie, 1937 g
 Culicoides innoxius Sen & Gupta, 1959 c g
 Culicoides inornatipennis (Carter, Ingram & Macfie, 1920) c g
 Culicoides inornatithorax Gupta, 1963 c g
 Culicoides insignipennis Macfie, 1937 c g
 Culicoides insignis Lutz, 1913 i c g
 Culicoides insinuatus Ortiz & Leon, 1954 c g
 Culicoides insolatus Wirth and Hubert, 1960 i c g
 Culicoides insulanus Macfie, 1933 c g
 Culicoides insularis Kitaoka, 1980 c g
 Culicoides interrogatus Lee & Reye, 1963 c g
 Culicoides inthanonensis Kitaoka, Takaoka & Choochote, 2005 c g
 Culicoides inyoensis Wirth and Blanton, 1969 i c g
 Culicoides iphthimus Zhou & Lee, 1984 c g
 Culicoides iranicus Naval, 1971 c g
 Culicoides iriartei Fox, 1952 c g
 Culicoides irregularis Santarem, Felippe-Bauer & Castellon g
 Culicoides irwini Spinelli, 1991 c g
 Culicoides isechnoensis Glick, 1990 c g
 Culicoides isioloensis (Cornet, Nevill & Walker, 1974) c g
 Culicoides jacksoni Atchley, 1970 i c g
 Culicoides jacobsoni Macfie, 1934 c g
 Culicoides jamaicensis Edwards, 1922 i c g
 Culicoides jamesi Fox, 1946 i c g
 Culicoides jamnbacki Wirth and Hubert, 1962 i c g
 Culicoides japonicus Arnaud, 1956 c g
 Culicoides javae Tokunaga, 1951 c g
 Culicoides javanicus Salm, 1918 c g
 Culicoides jefferyi Kitaoka, 1983 c g
 Culicoides jianfenglingensis Liu, 1995 c g
 Culicoides jimmiensis Tokunaga, 1959 c g
 Culicoides jonesi Wirth and Hubert, 1960 i c g
 Culicoides jouberti (Huttel, Huttel, & Verdier, 1953) c g
 Culicoides juddi Cochrane, 1973 i c g
 Culicoides jumineri Callot & Kremer, 1970 c g
 Culicoides jurbergi Felippe-Bauer, 2005 c g
 Culicoides jurensis Callot, Kremer & Deduit, 1962 c g

K

 Culicoides kaimosiensis Khamala, 1991 c g
 Culicoides kampa Felippe-Bauer, Veras, Castellon & Moreira, 2000 c g
 Culicoides kamrupi Sen & Gupta, 1959 c g
 Culicoides kanagai Khamala, 1991 c g
 Culicoides karagiensis Smatov & Aldabergenov, 1973 c g
 Culicoides karajevi Dzhafarov, 1961 c g
 Culicoides karakumensis Gutsevich & Molotova, 1973 c g
 Culicoides karenensis Glick, 1990 c g
 Culicoides kasimi Kasimi, 1961 c g
 Culicoides kelantanensis Wirth & Hubert, 1989 c g
 Culicoides kelinensis Lee, 1979 c g
 Culicoides kepongensis Wirth & Hubert, 1989 c g
 Culicoides kerichoensis Khamala, 1991 c g
 Culicoides kettlei Breidenbaugh & Mullens, 1999 c g
 Culicoides kibatiensis (Goetghebuer, 1935) c
 Culicoides kibunensis Tokunaga, 1937 i c g
 Culicoides kinabaluensis Wirth & Hubert, 1989 c g
 Culicoides kinari Howarth, 1985 c g
 Culicoides kingi (Austen, 1912) c g
 Culicoides kirbyi Glick and Mullen, 1983 i c g
 Culicoides kirgizicus Glukhova, 1973 c g
 Culicoides kirinensis Lee, 1976 c g
 Culicoides kisangkini Howarth, 1985 c g
 Culicoides klossi Edwards, 1933 c g
 Culicoides knowltoni Beck, 1956 i c g
 Culicoides kobae (Cornet & Chateau, 1971) c g
 Culicoides kolymbiensis Boorman, 1988 c g
 Culicoides komarovi Mirzayeva, 1985 c g
 Culicoides konmiaoensis Liu & Zhou, 2006 c g
 Culicoides koreensis Arnaud, 1956 c g
 Culicoides korossoensis (Huttel & Huttel, 1952) c g
 Culicoides kotonkan Boorman & Dipeolu, 1979 c g
 Culicoides krameri Clastrier, 1959 c g
 Culicoides kribiensis Kieffer, 1921 c g
 Culicoides krombeini Giles, Wirth & Messersmith, 1981 c g
 Culicoides kugitangi Atajev, 1976 c g
 Culicoides kumbaensis Callot, Kremer, Mouchet & Bach, 1965 c g
 Culicoides kurensis Dzhafarov, 1960 c g
 Culicoides kusaiensis Tokunaga, 1940 c g
 Culicoides kuscheli Wirth & Blanton, 1978 c g
 Culicoides kyotoensis Tokunaga, 1937 c g
 Culicoides kyushuensis Wada, 1986 c g

L

 Culicoides lacustris Ronderos, 1991 c g
 Culicoides lahillei Iches, 1906 g
 Culicoides lahontan Wirth and Blanton, 1969 i c g
 Culicoides laimargus Zhou & Lee, 1984 c g
 Culicoides lamborni Ingram & Macfie, 1925 c g
 Culicoides landauae Kremer, Rebholtz-Hirtzel & Bailly-Choumara, 1975 c g
 Culicoides lanei Ortiz, 1950 c g
 Culicoides langeroni Kieffer, 1921 c g
 Culicoides lansangensis Howarth, 1985 c g
 Culicoides lanyuensis Kitaoka & Tanaka, 1985 c g
 Culicoides laoensis Howarth, 1985 c g
 Culicoides lasaensis Lee, 1979 c g
 Culicoides latifrons Khamala, 1991 c g
 Culicoides latifrontis Shakirzyanova, 1962 c g
 Culicoides latipennis Kieffer, 1919 c g
 Culicoides leanderensis Lee & Reye, 1963 c g
 Culicoides leechi Wirth, 1977 i c g
 Culicoides leei Tokunaga, 1960 c g
 Culicoides lenae Gluschenko & Mirzayeva, 1970 c g
 Culicoides lenti Tavares & Dias, 1980 c g
 Culicoides leoni Barbosa, 1952 c g
 Culicoides leopoldoi Ortiz, 1951 c g
 Culicoides leucostictus Kieffer, 1911 c g
 Culicoides lichyi Floch & Abonnenc, 1949 c g
 Culicoides lieni Chen, 1979 c g
 Culicoides limai Barretto, 1944 c g
 Culicoides limonensis Ortiz & Leon, 1954 c g
 Culicoides lini Kitaoka & Tanaka, 1985 c g
 Culicoides liubaensis Liu, 2005 c g
 Culicoides liui Wirth & Hubert, 1961 c g
 Culicoides liukueiensis Kitaoka & Tanaka, 1985 c g
 Culicoides lobatoi Felippe-Bauer & Quintelas, 1994 c g
 Culicoides loisae Jamnback, 1965 i c g
 Culicoides longicercus Kitaoka, 1980 c g
 Culicoides longicollis Glukhova, 1971 c g
 Culicoides longior Hagan & Reye, 1986 c g
 Culicoides longipalpis Delfinado, 1961 c g
 Culicoides longipennis Khalaf, 1957 c g
 Culicoides longiporus Chu & Liu, 1978 c g
 Culicoides longiradialis Tokunaga, 1962 c g
 Culicoides longirostris Qu & Wang, 1994 c g
 Culicoides lopesi Barretto, 1944 c g
 Culicoides lophortygis Atchley and Wirth, 1975 i c g
 Culicoides loughnani Edwards, 1922 i c g
 Culicoides loxodontis Meiswinkel, 1992 c g
 Culicoides luganicus Shevchenko, 1972 c g
 Culicoides luglani Jones and Wirth, 1958 i c g
 Culicoides luilianchengi Chen, 1988 g
 Culicoides lulianchengi Chen, 1988 c g
 Culicoides lutealaris Wirth & Blanton, 1956 c g
 Culicoides luteolus Wirth & Hubert, 1989 c g
 Culicoides luteoventus Root & Hoffman, 1937 c g
 Culicoides luteovenus Root & Hoffman i g
 Culicoides lutzi Lima, 1937 c g
 Culicoides lyrinotatus Wirth & Blanton, 1955 c g

M

 Culicoides maai Wirth & Hubert, 1989 c g
 Culicoides macclurei Wirth & Hubert, 1989 c g
 Culicoides macfiei Causey, 1938 c g
 Culicoides machardyi (Campbell and Pelham-clinton) i
 Culicoides macieli Tavares & Ruiz, 1980 c g
 Culicoides macintoshi Cornet & Nevill, 1980 c g
 Culicoides mackerrasi Lee & Reye, 1963 c g
 Culicoides macrostigma Wirth & Blanton, 1953 c g
 Culicoides maculatus Shiraki, 1913 c g
 Culicoides maculipennis (Macfie, 1925) c g
 Culicoides maculiscutellaris Tokunaga, 1959 c g
 Culicoides maculitibialis Lien, Weng & Lin, 1997 c g
 Culicoides madagascarensis Meillon, 1961 c g
 Culicoides magnificus Sen & Gupta, 1959 c g
 Culicoides magnipalpis Wirth & Blanton, 1953 c g
 Culicoides magnipictus Tokunaga, 1962 c g
 Culicoides magnithecalis Gangopadhyay & Dasgupta, 2000 c g
 Culicoides magnus Colaco, 1946 c g
 Culicoides malariologiensis Perruolo, 1991 c g
 Culicoides malayae Macfie, 1937 c g
 Culicoides malevillei Kremer & Coluzzi, 1971 c g
 Culicoides mamaensis Lee, 1979 c g
 Culicoides manchuriensis Tokunaga, 1941 c g
 Culicoides manikumari Wirth & Hubert, 1989 c g
 Culicoides marcleti Callot, Kremer & Baset, 1968 c g
 Culicoides marginalis Chu & Liu, 1978 c g
 Culicoides marginatus Delfinado, 1961 c g
 Culicoides marginus Chu, 1984 c g
 Culicoides margipictus Qu & Wang, 1994 c g
 Culicoides marinkellei Wirth & Lee, 1967 c g
 Culicoides maritime Kieffer, 1924 c g
 Culicoides maritimus (Kieffer) i g
 Culicoides marium (Lutz) i g
 Culicoides marksi Lee & Reye, 1953 c g
 Culicoides marmoratus (Skuse, 1889) c g
 Culicoides marshi Wirth & Blanton, 1956 c g
 Culicoides martinezi Wirth & Blanton, 1970 c g
 Culicoides maruim Lutz, 1913 c g
 Culicoides mathisi Giles & Wirth, 1983 c g
 Culicoides matsuzawai Tokunaga, 1950 c g
 Culicoides mayeri Goetghebuer, 1935 c g
 Culicoides mcdonaldi Wirth & Hubert, 1989 c g
 Culicoides mcdowelli Delfinado, 1961 c g
 Culicoides mckeeveri Brickle & Hagan, 1999 c g
 Culicoides mcmillani Lee & Reye, 1953 c g
 Culicoides meijerei Kieffer, 1919 c g
 Culicoides melanesiae Macfie, 1939 c g
 Culicoides melleus (Coquillett, 1901) i c g
 Culicoides mellipes Wirth & Hubert, 1989 c g
 Culicoides menghaiensis Lee, 1980 c g
 Culicoides menglaensis Chu & Liu, 1978 c g
 Culicoides meridionalis Xue, Liu & Yu, 2003 c g
 Culicoides mesghalii Naval, 1973 c g
 Culicoides metagonatus Wirth & Blanton, 1956 c g
 Culicoides micheli Cornet & Chateau, 1971 c g
 Culicoides micromaculatus Vimmer, 1932 c g
 Culicoides midorensis Arnaud, 1956 c g
 Culicoides miharai (Kinoshita) i c g
 Culicoides mihunensis Chu, 1983 c g
 Culicoides mikros Dyce & Meiswinkel, 1995 c g
 Culicoides milnei Austen, 1909 c g
 Culicoides minasensis Felippe-Bauer, 1987 c g
 Culicoides minimus Wirth & Hubert, 1989 c g
 Culicoides minipalpis Wirth & Hubert, 1989 c g
 Culicoides minutissimus (Zetterstedt, 1855) g
 Culicoides minutus Sen & Gupta, 1959 c g
 Culicoides miombo Meiswinkel, 1991 c g
 Culicoides mirsae Ortiz, 1953 c g
 Culicoides mirzaevi Glukhova & Khabirov, 1977 c g
 Culicoides mississippiensis Hoffman, 1926 i c g
 Culicoides miuntissimus (Zetterstedt, 1855) c g
 Culicoides mohave Wirth, 1952 i c g
 Culicoides mojingaensis Wirth & Blanton, 1953 c g
 Culicoides molestior Kieffer, 1911 c g
 Culicoides molestus (Skuse) i c g
 Culicoides mollis Edwards, 1928 c g
 Culicoides molotovae Glukhova & Braverman, 1999 c g
 Culicoides mongolensis Yao, 1964 c g
 Culicoides monicae Spinelli & Borkent, 2004 c g
 Culicoides monoensis Wirth, 1952 i c g
 Culicoides monothecalis Tokunaga, 1962 c g
 Culicoides montanus Shakirzyanova, 1962 c g
 Culicoides monticola Wirth & Lee, 1967 c g
 Culicoides moreensis Lee & Reye, 1955 c g
 Culicoides moreli Clastrier, 1959 c g
 Culicoides morisitai Tokunaga, 1940 c g
 Culicoides mortivallis Wirth and Blanton, 1971 i c g
 Culicoides motoensis Lee, 1979 c g
 Culicoides moucheti Cornet & Kremer, 1970 c g
 Culicoides mukerjii Gangopadhyay & Dasgupta, 2000 c g
 Culicoides mulrennani Beck, 1957 i c g
 Culicoides multidentatus Atchley and Wirth, 1975 i
 Culicoides multifarious Liu, Gong, Zhang & Shi, 2003 c g
 Culicoides multimaculatus Taylor, 1918 c g
 Culicoides multinotatae Tokunaga, 1962 c g
 Culicoides multipunctatus Malloch, 1915 i c g
 Culicoides murphyi Clastrier & Wirth, 1961 c g
 Culicoides murrayi Wirth & Hubert, 1989 c g
 Culicoides murtalai Boorman & Dipeolu, 1979 c g
 Culicoides musajevi Dzhafarov, 1961 c g
 Culicoides muscicola Kieffer, 1925 c g
 Culicoides mykytowyczi Lee & Reye, 1963 c g
 Culicoides mystacinus Vimmer, 1932 c g

N

 Culicoides nagahanai Tokunaga, 1956 g
 Culicoides nagarzensis Lee, 1979 c g
 Culicoides nairobiensis Glick, 1990 c g
 Culicoides nampui Howarth, 1985 c g
 Culicoides namulus Kieffer, 1919 c g
 Culicoides nanellus Wirth and Blanton, 1969 i c g
 Culicoides nanpingensis Yu & Song, 1986 c g
 Culicoides nanus Root and Hoffman, 1937 i c g
 Culicoides narrabeenensis Lee & Reye, 1963 c g
 Culicoides nasuensis Kitaoka, 1984 c g
 Culicoides nattaiensis Lee & Reye, 1955 c g
 Culicoides navaiae Lane, 1983 c g
 Culicoides nayabazari Gupta, 1963 c g
 Culicoides neavei Austen, 1912 c g
 Culicoides neghmei Vargas, 1955 c g
 Culicoides neoangolensis Kremer, 1972 c g
 Culicoides neofagineus Wirth and Blanton, 1969 i c g
 Culicoides neomelanesiae Tokunaga, 1963 c g
 Culicoides neomontanus Wirth, 1976 i c g
 Culicoides neopalpalis Tokunaga, 1962 c g
 Culicoides neopalpifer Chen, 1983 g
 Culicoides neoparaensis Tavares & Alves de Souza, 1978 c g
 Culicoides neopulicaris Wirth, 1955 i c g
 Culicoides neoschultzei Boorman & Meiswinkel, 1989 c g
 Culicoides nevilli Cornet & Brunhes, 1994 c g
 Culicoides newsteadi Austen, 1921 c g
 Culicoides nielamensis Liu & Deng, 2000 c g
 Culicoides niger Root and Hoffman, 1937 i c g
 Culicoides nigeriae Ingram & Macfie, 1921 c g
 Culicoides nigrigenus Wirth & Blanton, 1956 c g
 Culicoides nigripennis Carter, Ingram & Macfie, 1920 c g
 Culicoides nigripes Wirth & Hubert, 1989 c g
 Culicoides nigritus Fei & Lee, 1984 c g
 Culicoides nigroannulatus Goetghebuer, 1932 c g
 Culicoides nigrosignatus Kieffer, 1901 c g
 Culicoides nigrus Tokunaga, 1941 c g
 Culicoides nilogenus Kieffer, 1921 c g
 Culicoides nilophilus Kieffer, 1921 c g
 Culicoides niphanae Wirth & Hubert, 1989 c g
 Culicoides nipponensis Tokunaga, 1955 c g
 Culicoides nitens Edwards, 1933 c g
 Culicoides nivosus Meillon, 1937 c g
 Culicoides nobrei Caeiro, 1961 c g
 Culicoides nocivum (Harris, 1841) c g
 Culicoides noshaquensis Tokunaga, 1966 c g
 Culicoides notatus Delfinado, 1961 c g
 Culicoides novaguineanus Tokunaga, 1959 c g
 Culicoides novairelandi Tokunaga, 1962 c g
 Culicoides novamexicanus Atchley, 1967 i c g
 Culicoides nubeculosus (Meigen, 1830) c g
 Culicoides nudipalpis Delfinado, 1961 c g
 Culicoides nudipennis Kieffer, 1922 c g
 Culicoides nukabirensis Wada, 1979 c g
 Culicoides nunomemoguri Kitaoka, 1980 c g
 Culicoides nuntius Cambournac, 1970 c g
 Culicoides nupurius Kanasugi & Kitaoka, 2001 c g
 Culicoides nyakini Howarth, 1985 c g
 Culicoides nyungnoi Howarth, 1985 c g

O

 Culicoides obnoxius Fox, 1952 c g
 Culicoides obscuripennis (Clastrier and Wirth) i
 Culicoides obsoletus (Meigen, 1818) i c g
 Culicoides occidentalis Wirth & Jones, 1957 c g
 Culicoides ochraceimaculatus Shevchenko, 1970 c g
 Culicoides ochraceipennis Shevchenko, 1970 c g
 Culicoides ochrothorax Carter, 1919 c g
 Culicoides octosignatus Kieffer, 1921 c g
 Culicoides oculatus (Strobl, 1910) c g
 Culicoides ocumarensis Ortiz, 1950 c g
 Culicoides odai Boorman, 1989 c g
 Culicoides odiatus Austen, 1921 c g
 Culicoides odiosus Kieffer, 1910 c g
 Culicoides okazawai Wada, 1990 c g
 Culicoides okinawensis Arnald, 1956 g
 Culicoides oklahomensis Khalaf, 1952 i c g
 Culicoides olyslageri Kremer & Nevill, 1972 c g
 Culicoides omogensis Arnaud, 1956 c g
 Culicoides onderstepoortensis Fiedler, 1951 c g
 Culicoides onoi Tokunaga, 1940 c g
 Culicoides oregonensis Wirth and Rowley, 1971 i c g
 Culicoides orestes Wirth & Hubert, 1989 c g
 Culicoides orientalis Macfie, 1932 c g
 Culicoides orjuelai Wirth & Lee, 1967 c g
 Culicoides ornatus Taylor, 1913 c g
 Culicoides ostroushkoae Glukhova, 1989 c g
 Culicoides ousairani Khalaf, 1952 i c g
 Culicoides ovalis Khamala, 1991 c g
 Culicoides owyheensis Jones and Wirth, 1978 i c g
 Culicoides oxianus Smatov & Kravets, 1976 c g

P

 Culicoides pabloi Browne, 1980 c g
 Culicoides pachymerus Lutz, 1914 c g
 Culicoides padusae Mirzayeva, 1990 c g
 Culicoides paksongi Howarth, 1985 c g
 Culicoides palauensis Tokunaga, 1959 c g
 Culicoides palawanensis Delfinado, 1961 c g
 Culicoides pallidicornis Kieffer, 1919 c g
 Culicoides pallidimaculosus Tokunaga, 1959 c g
 Culicoides pallidizonatus Tokunaga, 1963 c g
 Culicoides pallidothorax Lee & Reye, 1963 c g
 Culicoides pallidulus  g
 Culicoides pallidus Khalaf, 1957 c g
 Culicoides palmerae James, 1943 i c g
 Culicoides palpalis Macfie, 1948 c g
 Culicoides palpifer Gupta & Ghosh, 1956 c g
 Culicoides palpisimilis Wirth & Hubert, 1989 c g
 Culicoides pamiricus Zhogolev, 1973 c g
 Culicoides pampaensis Spinelli, 1991 c g
 Culicoides pampangensis Delfinado, 1961 c g
 Culicoides pampoikilus Macfie, 1948 i c g
 Culicoides panamensis Barbosa, 1947 c g
 Culicoides pancensis Browne, 1980 c g
 Culicoides pangkorensis Wirth & Hubert, 1989 c g
 Culicoides paolae Boorman, 1996 g
 Culicoides papillatus Khamala, 1991 c g
 Culicoides papilliger Borkent, 1997 c g
 Culicoides papuensis Tokunaga, 1962 c g
 Culicoides parabarnetti Wirth & Hubert, 1989 c g
 Culicoides parabubalus Wirth & Hubert, 1989 c g
 Culicoides paradisionensis Boorman, 1988 c g
 Culicoides paraensis (Goeldi, 1905) i c g
 Culicoides paraflavescens Wirth & Hubert, 1959 c g
 Culicoides paragarciai Dyce, 1996 c g
 Culicoides parahumeralis Wirth & Hubert, 1989 c g
 Culicoides paraignacioi Spinelli, 1993 c g
 Culicoides paraimpunctatus Borkent, 1995 c g
 Culicoides paraliui Gupta, 1962 c g
 Culicoides paramalayae Wirth & Hubert, 1989 c g
 Culicoides parapiliferus Wirth and Blanton, 1974 i c g
 Culicoides parararipalpis Gupta, 1963 c g
 Culicoides parascopus Wirth & Blanton, 1978 c g
 Culicoides parauapebensis  g
 Culicoides paregrinus Kieffer, 1910 g
 Culicoides parensis (Goeldi, 1905) c g
 Culicoides parroti Kieffer, 1922 c g
 Culicoides parvimaculatus Lee & Reye, 1953 c g
 Culicoides parviscriptus Tokunaga, 1959 c g
 Culicoides parvulus Khamala, 1991 c g
 Culicoides pastus Kitaoka, 1980 c g
 Culicoides patulipalpis Wirth & Blanton, 1959 c g
 Culicoides paucienfuscatus Barbosa, 1947 c g
 Culicoides paulipictus Tokunaga, 1977 c g
 Culicoides pechumani Cochrane, 1974 i c g
 Culicoides pecosensis Wirth, 1955 i c g
 Culicoides peculiaris Gangopadhyay & Dasgupta, 2000 c g
 Culicoides peliliouensis (Tokunaga) i c g
 Culicoides pellucidus Khamala, 1991 c g
 Culicoides pendleburyi Wirth & Hubert, 1989 c g
 Culicoides pentamaculatus Smatov & Kravets, 1976 c g
 Culicoides perakensis Kitaoka, 1983 c g
 Culicoides peregrinus Kieffer, 1910 c g
 Culicoides perettii Cornet & Chateau, 1971 c g
 Culicoides perornatus Delfinado, 1961 c g
 Culicoides peruvianus Felippe-Bauer, 2003 c g
 Culicoides petersi Tokunaga, 1962 c g
 Culicoides phaeonotus Wirth & Blanton, 1959 c g
 Culicoides phlebotomus (Williston) i c g
 Culicoides photophilus Kieffer, 1911 c g
 Culicoides picadoae Spinelli & Borkent, 2004 c g
 Culicoides pichindensis Browne, 1980 c g
 Culicoides pictellum (Rondani, 1869) c g
 Culicoides pictilis Wirth & Hubert, 1989 c g
 Culicoides pictipennis (Staeger, 1839) c g
 Culicoides picturatus Kremer & Deduit, 1961 c g
 Culicoides pifanoi Ortiz, 1951 c g
 Culicoides pikongkoi Howarth, 1985 c g
 Culicoides piliferus Root and Hoffman, 1937 i c g
 Culicoides pilosipennis Kieffer, 1924 c g
 Culicoides pilosus Wirth & Blanton, 1959 c g
 Culicoides platiradius Tokunaga, 1963 c g
 Culicoides plaumanni Spinelli, 1993 c g
 Culicoides plebotomus Williston, 1896 g
 Culicoides poikilonotus Macfie, 1948 c g
 Culicoides polynesiae Wirth & Arnaud, 1969 c g
 Culicoides polypori Wirth & Blanton, 1968 c g
 Culicoides polystictus Kieffer, 1921 c g
 Culicoides pongsomiensis Chu, 1986 c g
 Culicoides popayanensis Wirth & Lee, 1967 c g
 Culicoides poperinghensis Goetghebuer, 1953 g
 Culicoides poperonghensis Goetghebuer, 1953 c g
 Culicoides posoensis Wirth and Blanton, 1969 i c g
 Culicoides praesignis Delfinado, 1961 c g
 Culicoides pretoriensis Kremer & Nevill, 1972 c g
 Culicoides profundus Santarem, Felippe-Bauer & Trindade g
 Culicoides prolixipalpis Wirth & Hubert, 1989 c g
 Culicoides propinquus Macfie, 1948 c g
 Culicoides propriipennis Macfie, 1948 c g
 Culicoides pseudocordiger Wirth & Hubert, 1989 c g
 Culicoides pseudocrescentis Tavares & Dias, 1980 c g
 Culicoides pseudodiabolicus Fox, 1946 c g
 Culicoides pseudoheliconiae Felippe-Bauer, 2008 c g
 Culicoides pseudoheliophilus Callot & Kremer, 1961 c g
 Culicoides pseudolangeroni Kremer, Chaker & Delecolle, 1982 c g
 Culicoides pseudopallidipennis Clastrier, 1958 c g
 Culicoides pseudopallidus Khalaf, 1961 c g
 Culicoides pseudopalpalis Wirth & Hubert, 1989 c g
 Culicoides pseudoreticulatus Santarem, Felippe-Bauer & Castellon g
 Culicoides pseudosalinarius Chu, 1981 c g
 Culicoides pseudostigmaticus Tokunaga g
 Culicoides pseudostigmatus Tokunaga, 1959 c g
 Culicoides pseudoturgidus Gupta, 1962 c g
 Culicoides pulchellus Liu & Zhao, 1998 c g
 Culicoides pulchripennis Macfie, 1939 c g
 Culicoides pulicaris (Linnaeus, 1758) c g
 Culicoides pumilus (Winnertz, 1852) c g
 Culicoides puncticeps Goetghebuer, 1934 c g
 Culicoides puncticollis (Becker, 1903) c g
 Culicoides punctithorax Carter, Ingram & Macfie, 1920 c g
 Culicoides pungens de Meijere, 1909 c g
 Culicoides pungobovis Liu, Ge & Liu, 1996 c g
 Culicoides puracensis Wirth & Lee, 1967 c g
 Culicoides puripennis Austen, 1921 c g
 Culicoides purus Lee & Reye, 1963 c g
 Culicoides pusilloides Wirth & Blanton, 1955 c g
 Culicoides pusillus Lutz, 1913 i c g
 Culicoides pycnostictus Ingram & Macfie, 1925 c g
 Culicoides pygmaeus Tokunaga, 1963 c g

Q-R

 Culicoides qabdoensis Lee, 1979 c g
 Culicoides qinghaiensis Fei & Lee, 1984 c g
 Culicoides qiongzhongensis Liu, Ge & Liu, 1996 c g
 Culicoides quadratus Tokunaga, 1951 c g
 Culicoides quadrisignatus Kieffer, 1921 c g
 Culicoides quadrivittatus Vimmer, 1932 c g
 Culicoides quaiparaensis Clastrier, 1971 c g
 Culicoides quasiparaensis Clastrier, 1971 g
 Culicoides quatei Wirth & Hubert, 1989 c g
 Culicoides quaterifasciatus Tokunaga, 1959 c g
 Culicoides queenslandae Dyce & Wirth, 1997 c g
 Culicoides quinquelineatus Goetghebuer, 1934 c g
 Culicoides quinquermaculatus Vimmer, 1932 c g
 Culicoides rabauli Macfie, 1939 c g
 Culicoides rachoui Tavares & Alves de Souza, 1978 c g
 Culicoides radicitus Delfinado, 1961 c g
 Culicoides radiomaculatus Khamala, 1991 c g
 Culicoides rageaui Vattier & Adam, 1966 c g
 Culicoides ragulithecus Wirth & Hubert, 1989 g
 Culicoides rangeli Ortiz & Mirsa, 1952 c g
 Culicoides raposoensis Wirth & Barreto, 1978 c g
 Culicoides raripalpis Smith, 1929 c g
 Culicoides rariradialis Gupta, 1963 c g
 Culicoides rarus Gupta, 1963 c g
 Culicoides ravus Meillon, 1936 c g
 Culicoides reconditus Campbell & Pelham-Clinton, 1960 c g
 Culicoides recurvus Delfinado, 1961 c g
 Culicoides reevesi Wirth, 1952 i c g
 Culicoides remerki Boorman & Dipeolu, 1979 c g
 Culicoides remotus Kieffer, 1918 c g
 Culicoides reticulatus Lutz, 1913 c g
 Culicoides rhizophorensis Khamala, 1991 c g
 Culicoides rhombus Santarem, Felippe-Bauer & Castellon g
 Culicoides ribeiroi Lemble, 1991 c g
 Culicoides riebi Delecolle, Mathieu & Baldet, 2005 c g
 Culicoides riethi Kieffer, 1914 c g
 Culicoides riggsi Khalaf, 1957 i c g
 Culicoides riouxi Callot & Kremer, 1961 c g
 Culicoides ritzei Dzhafarov, 1964 c g
 Culicoides robini Cornet, 1970 c g
 Culicoides rochemus Cambournac, 1970 c g
 Culicoides rochenus Cambournac, 1970 g
 Culicoides rodriguezi Ortiz, 1968 c g
 Culicoides ronderosae Spinelli & Borkent, 2004 c g
 Culicoides rostratus Wirth & Blanton, 1956 c g
 Culicoides roswelli Giles & Wirth, 1983 c g
 Culicoides rugulithecus Wirth & Hubert, 1989 c g
 Culicoides ruiliensis Lee, 1980 c g
 Culicoides ruizi Forattini, 1954 c g
 Culicoides rutilis Ingram & Macfie, 1921 c g
 Culicoides ryckmani Wirth and Hubert, 1960 i c g

S

 Culicoides saboyae Cornet, 1970 c g
 Culicoides sabroskyi Tokunaga, 1959 c g
 Culicoides saevanicus Dzhafarov, 1960 c g
 Culicoides saevus Kieffer, 1922 c g
 Culicoides sahariensis Kieffer, 1923 c g
 Culicoides saintjusti Tavares & Ruiz, 1980 c g
 Culicoides sajanicus Mirzayeva, 1971 c g
 Culicoides salebrosus Liu, Gong, Zhang & Shi, 2003 c g
 Culicoides salihi Khalaf, 1952 i c g
 Culicoides salinarius (Kieffer) i c g
 Culicoides saltaensis Spinelli, 1991 c g
 Culicoides saltonensis Wirth, 1952 i c g
 Culicoides samoensis Wirth & Arnaud, 1969 c g
 Culicoides sanguisuga (Coquillett, 1901) i c g
 Culicoides saninensis Tokunaga, 1956 c g
 Culicoides sanmartini Wirth & Barreto, 1978 c g
 Culicoides santanderi Browne, 1980 c g
 Culicoides santonicus Callot, Kremer, Rault & Bach, 1966 c g
 Culicoides sarawakensis Wirth & Hubert, 1959 c g
 Culicoides saundersi Wirth and Blanton, 1969 i c g
 Culicoides scanloni Wirth and Hubert, 1962 i c g
 Culicoides schramae Giles, Wirth & Messersmith, 1981 c g
 Culicoides schultzei (Enderlein, 1908) c g
 Culicoides scopus Root & Hoffman, 1937 c g
 Culicoides scoticus Downes & Kettle, 1952 c g
 Culicoides segnis Cambell & Pelham-Clinton, 1960 c g
 Culicoides seimi Shevchenko, 1967 c g
 Culicoides sejfadinei Dzhafarov, 1958 c g
 Culicoides selangorensis Wirth & Hubert, 1989 c g
 Culicoides sellersi Boorman & Dipeolu, 1979 c g
 Culicoides semicircum Tokunaga, 1959 c g
 Culicoides semimaculatus Clastrier, 1958 c g
 Culicoides sensillatus Mirzayeva, 1971 c g
 Culicoides septemmaculatus Goetghebuer, 1935 c g
 Culicoides sergenti (Kieffer, 1921) c
 Culicoides shahgudiani Naval, 1973 c g
 Culicoides shaklawensis Khalaf, 1957 c g
 Culicoides shermani Causey, 1938 c g
 Culicoides shimoniensis Khamala, 1991 c g
 Culicoides shortti Smith & Swaminath, 1932 c g
 Culicoides siamensis Wirth & Hubert, 1989 c g
 Culicoides sibiricus Mirzayeva, 1964 c g
 Culicoides sierrensis Wirth and Blanton, 1969 i c g
 Culicoides sigaensis Tokunaga, 1937 c g
 Culicoides sigmoidus Lee & Reye, 1963 c g
 Culicoides signatus Kieffer, 1921 c g
 Culicoides sikkimensis Gupta, 1963 c g
 Culicoides silverstrii Kieffer, 1918 c g
 Culicoides similis Carter, Ingram & Macfie, 1920 c g
 Culicoides simulans Vimmer, 1932 c g
 Culicoides simulator Edwards, 1939 c g
 Culicoides sinanoensis Tokunaga, 1937 c g
 Culicoides sitiens Wirth and Hubert, 1960 i c g
 Culicoides slovacus Orszagh, 1969 c g
 Culicoides smeei Tokunaga, 1960 c g
 Culicoides snowi Wirth and Jones, 1956 i c g
 Culicoides sogdianus Gutsevich, 1966 c g
 Culicoides soleamaculatus  g
 Culicoides sommermanae Wirth and Blanton, 1969 i c g
 Culicoides sonorensis Wirth & Jones, 1957 c g
 Culicoides sordidellus (Zetterstedt, 1838) i c g
 Culicoides sousadiasi Caeiro, 1961 c g
 Culicoides sphagnumensis Williams, 1955 i c g
 Culicoides spiculae Howarth, 1985 c g
 Culicoides spinifer Khamala, 1991 c g
 Culicoides spinosus Root and Hoffman, 1937 i c g
 Culicoides spinoverbosus Qu & Wang, 1994 c g
 Culicoides spinulosus Khamala, 1991 c g
 Culicoides spurius Wirth & Blanton, 1959 c g
 Culicoides stagetus Lee, 1979 c g
 Culicoides stanicicus Shevchenko, 1970 c g
 Culicoides stellifer (Coquillett, 1901) i c g
 Culicoides stepicola Remm & Zhogoley, 1968 c g
 Culicoides stercorarius Khamala, 1991 c g
 Culicoides stigma (Meigen, 1818) c g
 Culicoides stigmalis Wirth, 1952 c g
 Culicoides stigmaticus Kieffer, 1911 c g
 Culicoides stilobezzioides Foot and Pratt, 1954 i c g
 Culicoides stonei James, 1943 i c g
 Culicoides suarezi Rodriguez & Wirth, 1986 c g
 Culicoides subfagineus Delecolle & Ortega, 1999 c g
 Culicoides subfasciipennis Kieffer, 1919 c g
 Culicoides subflavescens Wirth & Hubert, 1959 c g
 Culicoides subimmaculatus (Lee and Reye) i c g
 Culicoides sublettei Atchley, 1967 i c g
 Culicoides subltifrontis Smatov & Isimbekov, 1971 c g
 Culicoides submagnesianus Tokunaga, 1962 c g
 Culicoides subneglectus Vimmer, 1932 c g
 Culicoides suborientalis Tokunaga, 1951 c g
 Culicoides subpalpifer Wirth & Hubert, 1989 c g
 Culicoides subpunctatus Liu & Yu, 1996 c g
 Culicoides subravus Cornet & Chateau, 1971 c g
 Culicoides subschultzei Cornet & Brunhes, 1994 c g
 Culicoides subsylvarum Remm, 1981 c g
 Culicoides sumatrae Macfie, 1934 c g
 Culicoides superfluthecus Yu & Li, 1986 c g
 Culicoides superfulvus Gupta, 1962 c g
 Culicoides suspectus Zhou & Lee, 1984 c g
 Culicoides suzukii Kitaoka, 1973 g
 Culicoides swaminathi Gangopadhyay & Dasgupta, 2000 c g
 Culicoides sylvarum Callot & Kremer, 1961 c g
 Culicoides sylvicola Khamala, 1991 c g

T

 Culicoides tadzhikistanicus Zhogoley, 1969 c g
 Culicoides tahemanensis Liu & Ma, 2001 c g
 Culicoides taiwanensis Kitaoka & Tanaka, 1985 c g
 Culicoides talgariensis Gutsevich & Smatov, 1966 c g
 Culicoides tamada Howarth, 1985 c g
 Culicoides tamaensis Perruolo, 2006 c g
 Culicoides tamboensis Wirth & Lee, 1967 c g
 Culicoides taonanensis Ren, Wang & Liu, 2006 c g
 Culicoides tarapaca Spinelli, 1991 c g
 Culicoides tatebeae Kitaoka, 1991 c g
 Culicoides tauffiebi Clastrier, 1960 c g
 Culicoides tauricus Gutsevich, 1959 c g
 Culicoides tavaresi Felippe-Bauer & Wirth, 1988 c g
 Culicoides tawauensis Wirth & Hubert, 1989 c g
 Culicoides tayulingensis Chen, 1988 c g
 Culicoides tbilisicus Dzhafarov, 1964 c g
 Culicoides tentorius Austen, 1921 c g
 Culicoides tenuifasciatus Wirth & Hubert, 1989 c g
 Culicoides tenuilosus Wirth & Blanton, 1959 c g
 Culicoides tenuipalpis Wirth & Hubert, 1959 c g
 Culicoides tenuistylus Wirth, 1952 i c g
 Culicoides teretipalpis Wirth & Barreto, 1978 c g
 Culicoides testudinalis Wirth and Hubert, 1962 i c g
 Culicoides tetrathyris Wirth & Blanton, 1959 c g
 Culicoides thurmanae Wirth & Hubert, 1989 c g
 Culicoides tianmushanensis Chu, 1981 c g
 Culicoides tibetensis Chu, 1977 c g
 Culicoides tidwelli Spinelli, 1993 c g
 Culicoides tienhsiangensis Chen, 1988 c g
 Culicoides tissoti Wirth and Blanton, 1966 i c g
 Culicoides tobaensis Tokunaga, 1937 c g
 Culicoides tohokuensis Okada, 1941 c g
 Culicoides tokunagai Arnaud, 1956 c g
 Culicoides tonmai Howarth, 1985 c g
 Culicoides tororensis Khamala, 1991 c g
 Culicoides tororoensis Khamala & Kettle, 1971 c g
 Culicoides torreyae Wirth and Blanton, 1971 i c g
 Culicoides torridus Wirth and Hubert, 1960 i c g
 Culicoides towadaensis Okada, 1941 c g
 Culicoides toyamaruae Arnaud, 1956 c g
 Culicoides transferrans Ortiz, 1953 c g
 Culicoides translucens Khamala, 1991 c g
 Culicoides trapidoi Wirth & Barreto, 1978 c g
 Culicoides travassosi Forattini, 1957 c g
 Culicoides travisi Vargas, 1949 i c g
 Culicoides triallantionis Howarth, 1985 c g
 Culicoides triangulatus Shevchenko, 1970 c g
 Culicoides trichopis Meillon, 1937 c g
 Culicoides trifasciellus Goetghebuer, 1935 c g
 Culicoides trifidus Spinelli & Borkent, 2004 c g
 Culicoides trilineatus Fox, 1946 c g
 Culicoides trimaculatus McDonald & Wu, 1972 g
 Culicoides trimaculipennis Wirth & Hubert, 1989 c g
 Culicoides trinidadensis Hoffman, 1925 c g
 Culicoides tripallidus Tokunaga, 1959 c g
 Culicoides trisignatus Kieffer, 1921 c g
 Culicoides tristanii Huttel & Verdier, 1953 c g
 Culicoides tristriatulus Hoffman, 1925 i c g
 Culicoides tritenuifasciatus Tokunaga, 1959 c g
 Culicoides trivittatus Vimmer, 1932 c g
 Culicoides trizonatus Tokunaga, 1963 c g
 Culicoides tropicalis Kieffer, 1913 c g
 Culicoides trouilleti Itoua & Cornet, 1987 c g
 Culicoides truncatus Borkent, 2000 c g
 Culicoides truncorum Edwards, 1939 c g
 Culicoides tsutaensis Wada, 1990 c g
 Culicoides tuamsombooni Kitaoka, Takaoka & Choochote, 2005 c g
 Culicoides tugaicus Dzhafarov, 1960 c g
 Culicoides tunkinensis Mirzayeva, 1985 c g
 Culicoides turanicus Gutsevich & Smatov & Isimbekov, 1971 c g
 Culicoides turgidus Sen & Gupta, 1959 c g
 Culicoides tuttifrutti Meiswinkel & Linton, 2003 c g

U-V

 Culicoides ukrainensis Shevchenko, 1970 c g
 Culicoides uncistylus Wirth & Hubert, 1989 c g
 Culicoides undentaris Liu, 2002 c g
 Culicoides unetensis Perruolo, 2001 c g
 Culicoides unicolor (Coquillett, 1905) i c g
 Culicoides unicus Delfinado, 1961 c g
 Culicoides uniradialis Wirth & Blanton, 1953 c g
 Culicoides univittatus Vimmer, 1932 c g
 Culicoides uruguayensis Ronderos, 1991 c g
 Culicoides usingeri Wirth, 1952 i c g
 Culicoides ustinovi Shevchenko, 1962 c g
 Culicoides utahensis Fox, 1946 i c g
 Culicoides utowana Jamnback, 1965 i c g
 Culicoides vagus Cornet & Chateau, 1971 c g
 Culicoides variatus Liu, Ge & Liu, 1996 c g
 Culicoides variifrons Glukhova & Ivanov & Glukhova, 1967 c g
 Culicoides variipennis (Coquillett, 1901) i c g b
 Culicoides venezulensis Ortiz & Mirsa, 1950 c g
 Culicoides venustus Hoffman, 1925 i c g
 Culicoides verbosus Tokunaga, 1937 c g
 Culicoides verecundus Macfie, 1948 c g
 Culicoides vetustus Breidenbaugh & Mullens, 1999 c g
 Culicoides vexans (Staeger, 1839) c g
 Culicoides vicinus Clastrier, 1960 c g
 Culicoides victoriae Macfie, 1941 c g
 Culicoides vidourlensis Callot, Kremer, Molet & Bach, 1968 c g
 Culicoides villosipennis Root & Hoffman, 1937 i c g b
 Culicoides virginea (Preyssler, 1791) c g
 Culicoides vistulensis (Skierska) i
 Culicoides vitreipennis Austen, 1921 c g
 Culicoides vitshumbiensis Goetghebuer, 1935 c g
 Culicoides vomensis Boorman & Dipeolu, 1979 c g

W-Z

 Culicoides wadai Kitaoka, 1980 c g
 Culicoides walkeri Boorman, 1979 c g
 Culicoides wandashanensis Wang & Liu, 1999 c g
 Culicoides wansoni Goetghebuer, 1935 c g
 Culicoides wardi Boorman, 1989 c g
 Culicoides waringi Lee & Reye, 1955 c g
 Culicoides wenzeli Delfinado, 1961 c g
 Culicoides werneri Wirth and Blanton, 1971 i c g
 Culicoides williamsi Spinelli, 2005 c g
 Culicoides willistoni Wirth & Blanton, 1953 c g
 Culicoides williwilli Lee & Reye, 1955 c g
 Culicoides wirthi Foote and Pratt, 1954 i c g
 Culicoides wirthomyia Vargas, 1953 c g
 Culicoides wisconsinensis Jones, 1956 i c g
 Culicoides wokei Fox, 1947 c g
 Culicoides wuyiensis Chen, 1981 c g
 Culicoides xanifer Wirth & Blanton, 1968 c g
 Culicoides xanthoceras Kieffer, 1917 c g
 Culicoides xanthogaster Kieffer, 1918 c g
 Culicoides xinjiangensis Chu, Qian & Ma, 1982 c g
 Culicoides xuguitensis Cao & Chen, 1984 c g
 Culicoides yadongensis Chu, 1984 c g
 Culicoides yamii Lien, Lin & Weng, 1998 c g
 Culicoides yanbianensis Liu, 2006 c g
 Culicoides yankari Boorman & Dipeolu, 1979 c g
 Culicoides yasumatsui Tokunaga, 1941 c g
 Culicoides yemenensis Boorman, 1989 c g
 Culicoides yoosti Borkent, 2000 c g
 Culicoides yoshimurai Tokunaga, 1941 c g
 Culicoides youngi Wirth & Barreto, 1978 c g
 Culicoides yuchihensis Lien, Lin & Weng, 1998 c g
 Culicoides yukonensis Hoffman, 1925 i c g
 Culicoides yunanensis Chu & Liu, 1978 c g
 Culicoides zhogolevi Remm & Zhogolev, 1968 c g
 Culicoides zikaensis Khamala, 1991 c g
 Culicoides zuluensis Meillon, 1936 c g
 Culicoides zumbadoi Spinelli & Borkent, 2004 c g

Data sources: i = ITIS, c = Catalogue of Life, g = GBIF, b = Bugguide.net

References

Culicoides